Annika Liebs (6 September 1979), previously Annika Lurz, is an Olympic and former World Record-holding swimmer from Germany. She swam for her homeland at the 2008 Olympics.

In 2005, she was a member of the German team that won the silver medal in the 4×100 m freestyle relay at the World Championships in Montreal; and captured three medals (2 silver, 1 bronze) at the Summer Universiade in İzmir, Turkey.

At the 2006 European Championships in Budapest, she clocked the then fastest-ever split in the 4×200 m freestyle relay (1.55.64), helping the Germany team to break the world record in the event with their 7.50.82. Other members of the relay were: Petra Dallmann, Daniela Samulski, and Britta Steffen. Also in the pool during the 4×200 m freestyle relay was France's Laure Manaudou, who swam the then-second fastest split ever (1.56.23). Also at the 2006 European Championships, Annika also swam on Germany's 4×100 m freestyle relay that also set a new world record (3:35.22).

At the 2007 World Championships, she swam the then second-faster-ever time in the women's 200 m freestyle (1:55.68), in finishing second behind Laure Manaudou's world record winning performance; setting the German record in the process. Also at the 2007 Worlds, she was part of Germany's silver medalist 4×200 m freestyle relay.

One month after the 2006 European Championships finished, Annika married her coach Stefan Lurz. The couple divorced in 2013.

See also
 List of German records in swimming

References

External links 
 
 

1979 births
Living people
Sportspeople from Karlsruhe
German female swimmers
German female backstroke swimmers
World record setters in swimming
Swimmers at the 2008 Summer Olympics
Olympic swimmers of Germany
German female freestyle swimmers
World Aquatics Championships medalists in swimming
Medalists at the FINA World Swimming Championships (25 m)
European Aquatics Championships medalists in swimming
Universiade medalists in swimming
Universiade silver medalists for Germany
Universiade bronze medalists for Germany
Medalists at the 2007 Summer Universiade